Bedlno may refer to the following places:
Bedlno, Łódź Voivodeship (central Poland)
Bedlno, Lublin Voivodeship (east Poland)
Bedlno, Świętokrzyskie Voivodeship (south-central Poland)
Bedlno, West Pomeranian Voivodeship (north-west Poland)